The  ("Black, Red, [and] Gold Banner of the Reich") was an organization in Germany during the Weimar Republic, formed by members of the Social Democratic Party of Germany (SPD), the German Centre Party, and the (liberal) German Democratic Party in February 1924. Its goal was to defend parliamentary democracy against internal subversion and extremism from the left and right, to compel the population to respect the new Republic, to honor its flag and the constitution. Its name is derived from the Flag of Germany adopted in 1919, the colors of which were associated with the Weimar Republic and liberal German nationalism.

The 's main opponents were the Communist Party of Germany and their  on the left, and the Nazi Party and their  on the right. The third opponent were the 'reactionary' traditional nationalist parties. Following the Nazi takeover,  members played a role in the anti-Nazi resistance.

The post war club is no longer a paramilitary organization but organizes seminars and similar activities. In line with its tradition it is officially open for members of all democratic parties but is closely aligned with the SPD. It has connections with the Memorial to the German Resistance and to members of the armed forces and the police.

Establishment and objectives 

Right wing and nationalist armed groups, like the nationalist  or the nazi Sturmabteilung, as well as the left-wing  had continued to radicalize and intensify the political struggle in Germany. The  was initially formed in reaction to the far right's Beer Hall Putsch and far left's Hamburg rebellion, both failed coups, which had taken place at the end of 1923. However the proportion of Social Democrats in the membership clearly outweighed all others, with estimates of up to 90 per cent. In the fall of 1927 the  expelled all members belonging to the Old Social Democratic Party, accusing that new party of seeking alliances with fascists.

 was a veterans' federation, in which former soldiers of the First World War enlisted their military experience in the service of the republic. It thus saw its main task as the defense of the Weimar Republic against enemies from the National Socialist, monarchist and Communist camps. Social Democratic politician Otto Hörsing designated  in 1931 as a 'non-partisan protection organization of the Republic and democracy in the fight against the swastika and the Soviet star'. Members saw themselves as guardians of the inheritance of Germany's democratic tradition, going back to the Revolutions of 1848, and of the constitutional national colors: black, red and gold.

Structure and organisation

The political organization was headed by the Federal Administration comprising a 1st and 2nd chairman, three deputies, the federal treasurer, federal cashier, secretary, technical manager, federal youth leader, the sitting representatives and 15 assessors. The Federal Chairman was from 3 June 1932 Otto Hörsing. His deputy and later successor was Karl Höltermann. Beneath the federal level, Germany was divided up into gaus, circles, districts and finally local associations. The executive committees of all organizational levels were elected from the membership of the all republican parties in concert.

Parallel to it, the operational organization was modeled as a military structure. The smallest unit was the group, with a group leader and eight men. Two to five groups formed a platoon (Zug), two to three courses formed a Kameradschaft, which corresponded to a company of the army, between two and five of which constituted a department (Abteilung) with two to five departments making up a district. At least two districts formed a circle. At Gau and federal level operational and political level structures overlapped so that The Federal Chairman was at the same time also Federal Commander, while each of the 32 Gau chairmen was also Gauführer. The command personnel of the operational organisation were also recognized by badges of rank. The Federal Commander, for example, wore on his lower sleeve the federal eagle (black on a red field, with golden circular border) and two black-red-golden stripes over all.

According to the organization's own records, membership in 1932 was put at three million.

Fight for the Republic, 1930–1933

Active members were divided into master formations (Stafo) and the elite units into protection formations (Schufo). In addition there were the "Young Banners". 250,000 men belonged to the Schufos in Spring 1931.

The last federal general assembly of the  met on 17–18 February 1933 in Berlin. In March  and the Iron Front were banned throughout the Reich.

members in the Resistance

In the now illegal underground organisations, the organisation's membership, in particular the former Schufos represented an important component in the Social Democratic resistance to the Nazi regime, for example the groups centred on Theodor Haubach and Karl Heinrich in Berlin and around Walter Schmedemann in Hamburg as well as the Socialist Front in Hanover.

members today
The  was re-formed in 1953 as an association for political education.

See also 

 Weimar paramilitary groups
 Iron Front
 Republikanischer Schutzbund

References

Bibliography 
 Günther Gerstenberg: Freiheit! Sozialdemokratischer Selbstschutz im München der zwanziger und frühen dreißiger Jahre., 2 volumes; Andechs 1997;  
 Helga Gotschlich: Zwischen Kampf und Kapitulation. Zur Geschichte des Reichsbanners Schwarz-Rot-Gold.; Dietz, Berlin (Est), 1987;  
 David Magnus Mintert: "Sturmtrupp der Deutschen Republik". Das Reichsbanner Schwarz-Rot-Gold im Wuppertal (= Verfolgung und Widerstand in Wuppertal, vol. 6; Grafenau 2002;  
 Karl Rohe:  Das Reichsbanner Schwarz Rot Gold. Ein Beitrag zur Geschichte und Struktur der politischen Kampfverbände zur Zeit der Weimarer Republik. Droste, Düsseldorf 1966. 
 Pamela E. Swett: Neighbors and Enemies: The Culture of Radicalism in Berlin, 1929-1933. Cambridge, England: Cambridge University Press, 2004;  
 Carsten Voigt: Kampfbünde der Arbeiterbewegung. Das Reichsbanner Schwarz-Rot-Gold und der Rote Frontkämpferbund in Sachsen 1924–1933 (= Geschichte und Politik in Sachsen, Bd. 26). Böhlau, Köln/Weimar/Wien 2009;

External links

Social Democratic Party of Germany
Paramilitary organisations of the Weimar Republic
Anti-fascist organisations in Germany
1924 establishments in Germany
1933 disestablishments in Germany
Left-wing militant groups in Germany
Military wings of socialist parties
Military units and formations established in 1924
Military units and formations disestablished in 1933
Anti-communist organizations in Germany